Florida crackers were colonial-era British, American pioneer settlers in what is now the U.S. state of Florida; the term is also applied to their descendants, to the present day, and their subculture among white Southerners. The first crackers arrived in 1763 after Spain traded Florida to Great Britain following the latter's victory over France in the Seven Years' War, though much of traditional Florida cracker folk culture dates to the 19th century.

Historical usage
The term cracker was in use during the Elizabethan era to describe braggarts and blowhards. The original root of this is the Middle English word , meaning 'entertaining conversation' (which survives as a verb, as in "to crack a joke"); the noun in the Gaelicized spelling craic also retains currency in Ireland and to some extent in Scotland and Northern England, in a sense of 'fun' or 'entertainment' especially in a group setting. Cracker is documented in William Shakespeare's King John, Act II, Scene I (1595): "What cracker is this same that deafs our ears / With this abundance of superfluous breath?"

By the 1760s, the ruling classes, both in Britain and in the American colonies, applied the term cracker to Scots-Irish, Scottish, and English American settlers of the remote southern back country, as noted in a letter to the Earl of Dartmouth: "I should explain to your Lordship what is meant by Crackers; a name they have got from being great boasters; they are a lawless set of rascalls on the frontiers of Virginia, Maryland, the Carolinas, and Georgia, who often change their places of abode."  The word was later associated with the cowboys of Georgia and Florida, many of them descendants of those early colonizers who had migrated south.

A folk etymology suggests that the name cracker instead derives from the cracking of cattle-drovers' whips.

Cracker cowmen

In Florida, those who own or work cattle traditionally have been called cowmen. In the late 1800s, they were often called cow hunters or cowhunters, a reference to seeking out cattle scattered over the wooded rangelands during roundups. At times, the terms cowman and cracker have been used interchangeably because of similarities in their folk culture. Today, the western term cowboy is often used for those who work cattle.

The Florida "cowhunter" or "cracker cowboy" of the 19th and early 20th centuries was distinct from the Spanish  and the Western cowboy. Florida cowboys did not use lassos to herd or capture cattle. Their primary tools were dogs and cow whips. Florida cattle and horses were smaller than the western breeds.

Modern usage
Among some Floridians, the term is used as a proud or jocular self-description. Since the huge influx of new residents into Florida in the late 20th and early 21st centuries, from the northern parts of the United States and from Mexico and Latin America, the term Florida cracker is used informally by some Floridians to indicate that their families have lived in the state for many generations. It is considered a source of pride to be descended from "frontier people who did not just live but flourished in a time before air conditioning, mosquito repellent, and screens" according to Florida history writer Dana Ste. Claire.

Cracker Storytelling Festival
Since the late 20th century, the Cracker Storytelling Festival has been held annually in the fall at Homeland Heritage Park in Homeland, Florida. The year 2013 marked the 25th anniversary of the festival. The Cracker Storytelling Festival includes many storytellers from around Florida who come to share their stories with visitors. The majority of visitors who attend this event are students, because storytelling is part of the Florida educational curriculum. The festival also incorporates local crafts and artwork, food vendors, a whip-cracking contest, and living-history re-enactment of 19th-century homestead life.

Notable Florida crackers
 Bone Mizell (1863–1921) – the best known of the original Florida cracker cowboys, made famous as the subject of a Frederic Remington painting
 Ben Hill Griffin Jr. (1910–1990) – "Cracker millionaire from Frostproof, Florida"
 Al Burt (1927–2008) – journalist at The Miami Herald, and chronicler of contemporary Florida cracker subculture.

See also
 Cracker (term) – about use of the term as a slur
 Cracker Country – a living-history village at the Florida State Fair
 Florida cracker (disambiguation) – lists things named after the Florida crackers (architecture, trail, cattle and horse breeds, etc.)
 Florida Western – a film and novel genre set in 19th-century Florida
 Georgia cracker – the related subculture of the US state of Georgia, just to the north of Florida

References

Further reading

Fiction 
 Many works by Marjorie Kinnan Rawlings:  South Moon Under (1933), Golden Apples (1935), The Yearling (1938), Cross Creek (1942), and numerous short stories are set amidst early-20th-century Florida cracker subculture
Strawberry Girl (1945) – children's novel by Lois Lenski set in mid-20th-century cracker Florida
Seraph on the Suwanee (1948) – novel by African-American novelist Zora Neale Hurston, and her only work that focuses primarily on white characters
A Land Remembered (1984) – a multi-generational novel about a Floridian family from 1858 to 1968, by Patrick D. Smith

External links
 Cracker Cowboys, documentary film by Victor Milt
 Florida Crackers: The Cattlemen and Cowboys of Florida (2011), documentary film by John Michie
 Butch Harrison, Florida cracker storyteller

English-American history
Florida cracker culture
People from Florida
American regional nicknames
American cattlemen
Cowboys